Ian Robert James Jack, FBA (5 December 1923 – 3 September 2008) was a British academic. 

He was Reader in English Poetry at the University of Cambridge from 1973 to 1976 and Professor from 1976 to 1989.

References 

1923 births
2008 deaths
Fellows of the British Academy
People from Edinburgh
Alumni of the University of Edinburgh
Alumni of Merton College, Oxford
British academics of English literature
Academics of the University of Cambridge